Emmett B. "Branch" McCracken (June 9, 1908 – June 4, 1970) was an American basketball player and coach. He served as the head basketball coach at Ball State University from 1930 to 1938 and at Indiana University Bloomington from 1938 to 1943 and again from 1946 to 1965.  McCracken's Indiana Hoosiers teams twice won the NCAA Championship, in 1940 and 1953.  McCracken was inducted into the Naismith Memorial Basketball Hall of Fame as a player in 1960.

Playing career
As a player at Indiana, McCracken was a three-year letter winner. His coach and predecessor, Hall of Fame coach Everett Dean, called McCracken "rough and tough." McCracken never missed a game. Once, when slowed by injuries, he planted himself near the free throw line, back to the basket, from there passing off to players cutting by him or keeping the ball and rolling to the basket himself. "Once we saw what he could do, we let him go," Dean said. "He was one of the first college centers who played the pivot the way it's played today."

McCracken scored 32.3 percent of the points his three Hoosier teams scored. He led the Big Ten Conference with a 12.3 average his senior year and graduated as the league's career scoring record holder.

McCracken was a consensus All-American in 1930. Upon his induction into the Naismith Memorial Basketball Hall of Fame in 1960, he was the first man ever voted there for his performance as an Indiana player.

After his college career, McCracken played professional basketball for a few local and barnstorming teams, most notably the Indianapolis Kautskys with John Wooden and Frank Beard. This was often done while he was also coaching or working at another job and involved long car trips.

Coaching career

Ball State
McCracken was the head coach for Ball State University from 1930–38 and compiled a 93–41 record. He led Ball State to the school's only victory over Indiana in school history in a year the Cardinals went 17–4.

Indiana
In 1938 McCracken succeeded Everett Dean and coached the Indiana University Hoosiers. His teams were known as the "Hurrying Hoosiers" because of McCracken's emphasis on the fast break. During his two spans at Indiana from 1938–1943 and 1946–1965 he compiled a 364–174 record. During the intermission from 1943 to 1946, he served as a lieutenant in the United States Navy, in World War II.

McCracken's first Indiana team was led by All-America Ernie Andres, later a McCracken basketball assistant. In McCracken's first year, the team finished 17–3, splitting games with both Purdue and eventual NCAA runnerup Ohio State. The following year the 1939–40 NCAA title team, led by All-American Marvin Huffman, would take Indiana to unprecedented success: an NCAA title and a record (at the time) 20 wins. This championship put McCracken in the record books as the youngest coach to win the NCAA championship (31 years old). The 20–3 record by that team would not be bested for another 13 years until broken again by Indiana. At their home court at The Fieldhouse, Indiana saw six perfect seasons including a 24-game unbeaten home winning streak from 1938–1941. In 1948, McCracken was responsible for recruiting Bill Garrett who became the first African American player in Big Ten varsity basketball history.

The Hoosiers' 1952–53 NCAA title team—led by Bobby Leonard, Dick Farley, and three-time All-American Don Schlundt—won the Big Ten and went on to win the NCAA championship by defeating reigning champions Kansas by one point. The Hoosiers would again win the Big Ten the following season in 1953–54. Just a few years later the team won back-to-back conference championships in 1956–57 and 1957–58 behind the leadership of two-time All-American Archie Dees. A few years later the Hoosiers were led by two-time All-American Walt Bellamy, one of the few African-American players in college basketball at the time.

In the fall of 1960 the Indiana Hoosiers football program was hit with devastating NCAA sanctions that impacted every varsity sport at the school, including basketball. Although the violations only occurred within the football program, all Hoosier varsity sports were barred from postseason play during the probationary period. The sanctions drastically undermined the ability of coaches to lure talented players to Indiana. Nevertheless, McCracken did manage to successfully recruit twins Dick Van Arsdale and Tom Van Arsdale, both of whom would earn All-America honors in 1965.

McCracken ultimately coached IU for 23 years, amassing 364 wins and 210 Big Ten wins. His teams also won four regular season Big Ten titles and went to the NCAA tournament four times, winning two national titles.

Death
McCracken died on June 4, 1970, from heart failure. He was buried at Mount Pleasant Cemetery in Hall, Indiana.

Legacy
McCracken was enshrined in the Naismith Memorial Basketball Hall of Fame as a player in 1960.  He was also honored by Monrovia Jr.-Sr. High School when his name was given to the main gymnasium. Indiana's court at Assembly Hall is also named for him.

Head coaching record

See also
 List of NCAA Division I Men's Final Four appearances by coach

References

External links
 
 Indiana Basketball Hall of Fame profile

1908 births
1970 deaths
All-American college men's basketball players
American men's basketball players
Ball State Cardinals men's basketball coaches
Basketball coaches from Indiana
Basketball players from Indiana
Centers (basketball)
College men's basketball head coaches in the United States
Indiana Hoosiers men's basketball coaches
Indiana Hoosiers men's basketball players
Indianapolis Kautskys players
National Collegiate Basketball Hall of Fame inductees
Naismith Memorial Basketball Hall of Fame inductees
People from Monrovia, Indiana